Casshan, also known in Japan as , is an anime series created by Tatsunoko Productions founder Tatsuo Yoshida in 1973.

The Casshern franchise also includes a 1993 original video animation titled Casshan: Robot Hunter, and a 2004 live-action adaptation titled Casshern. In October 2008, a reboot of the franchise Casshern Sins premiered. In anticipation of the upcoming series, a DVD box set of the original series, Neo-Human Casshern Complete DVD-Box "All Episodes of Casshern", was released in Japan on September 24, 2008. Casshern also appears in Tatsunoko Fight and Tatsunoko vs. Capcom: Ultimate All-Stars as a playable character. At Anime Expo 2013, Sentai Filmworks announced that they had signed a deal with Tatsunoko to release some of their catalog, with Casshan being confirmed as one of the characters involved. Sentai Filmworks released the series on DVD and Blu-ray Disc in the United States on March 4, 2014.

Plot
Tetsuya turned himself into an android to hunt down and destroy the robots that have taken over the world.

His biological father, Dr. Kotaro Azuma, was the inventor of the automatons that were originally intended to serve humankind. However, the first android, BK-1, was struck by lightning and went out of control. Despite great efforts to stop it, BK-1 used its great strength to escape from the castle. After some time, it renamed itself Buraiking Boss (often mistranslated in English as "Black King Boss"; the name is derived from 無頼 or burai, meaning rogue or brute, using the symbols for "trust" and "nothing," but phonetically "Bu Rai" can mean "Lightning Man" or "Lightning Warrior," so the name fits with his background). The Buraiking Boss then built a robot army against mankind. The robots mutinied en masse when they logically concluded that the good of the Earth's ecosystem required the destruction of the human race.

Casshern and his robotic dog, Friender, join forces with a beautiful girl named Luna Kozuki to battle the robots led by the Buraiking Boss. Friender can transform itself into a tank or a jet aircraft and actively helps Casshern fight the robot army. Casshern has great strength and agility, but he is not armed, except for a pair of strange pistols, which are used more like rockets than weapons. While the robots are huge and robust machines, almost all of them have an antenna on top of their heads; ripping it off usually causes them to explode, so they are relatively vulnerable. Casshern can usually destroy the robots with his bare hands, dispatching a great number in any given battle.

However, Casshern also has some weak points. His body must be re-charged with solar energy and cannot sustain very long battles without risking low battery power. Luna started out as being totally harmless, until her father built an electromagnetic pistol, which was easily capable of destroying the robots.

Characters

The protagonist of the series, Casshern is an android—the union of Tetsuya Azumas consciousness with an invincible body. His body features a number of unique android functions, including superhuman speed, agility and strength, an opening and closing face mask, a golden crescent-shaped solar panel on his forehead and waist-mounted pulsar propellers that can also be used as weapons.

A beautiful 15-year-old girl who fights alongside Casshern. Like Tetsuya's, her father is a scientist, and she is essential in the battle against the Android Army, due to her Electromagnetic Field Gun.

She observes the actions of Buraiking Boss and appears before Casshern as a hologram to offer support to her son.

The genius scientist who invented androids in hopes of helping mankind, and ironically became the architect of mankind's doom.

Originally Tetsuya's pet dog, his data was used to revive him as Friender after he was killed. In order to support Casshern, he can transform into a jet, submarine, tank, or motorcycle, and is even able to breathe flames. Friender is a brave robotic dog capable of standing up to the Android Army alone.

The main antagonist of the series, originally BK-1, the first android created by Dr. Azuma. He was designed to help bring the human race and the robots together, but he was struck by lightning and rebelled, renaming himself Buraiking Boss. He leads the Android Army in a plot to conquer the Earth.

A muscular high-ranking member of the Android Army.

A lanky high-ranking member of the Android Army.

A short high-ranking member of the Android Army.

Episodes

Title romanization

Streamline Pictures was the first to adapt the character's name in the OVA remake series for the American market, providing the title, "Casshan." Japan most commonly uses "Casshern" as the romanization and is thus used in the official romanized title of the film adaptation and the American release of Casshern Sins although, the name Casshan is still used for marketing. Both the Japanese and English versions of the official Tatsunoko website use Casshan for the romanized title of the original 1973 series. Advertising for Tatsunoko's Infini-T Force contains the Casshan name in several instances. Italian versions of the series romanize the name as "Kyashan," resembling the literal pronunciation of the Japanese title.

Legacy
In Vanquish, developed by PlatinumGames, the art style is based on Casshern. In one of the boss fights the main character drills through a robot by spinning in place at high speed, similarly to Casshern. Concerning the game's development, director Shinji Mikami is quoted as saying: "I was inspired by Casshern, so I wanted to make a game like that. If I went ahead and made the exact game I wanted, it probably would have been like Casshern, where you punch and kick the entire way through. But obviously if it were a game with only punching and kicking, I already did that with God Hand. So, I'm done with that, something else now. So this time he wanted to make a game where you defeat robots with guns. So now, you're going at it with guns, but he wanted to make sure the feeling of speed is still there, that was really important to him, so that's why he introduced the element of the sliding boost." In addition, the protagonist of Vanquish has a facemask that periodically comes off to show his human side, much like Casshern himself. According to one of the game's character modelers, Yoshifumi Hattori, a support robotic companion dog was designed to fight along with the main character, including transforming into ability-enhancing armor. Although this dog was successfully modeled, it was cut from the finalized version of the game, along with another female android partner character. Raiden from Metal Gear Solid 4: Guns of the Patriots is also dressed like Casshern.

See also
 Robot Hunter Casshern – A four-episode OVA produced in 1993, released in English as Casshan: Robot Hunter.
 Casshern – A 2004 live-action tokusatsu film adaptation.
 Casshern Sins – A 2008 anime series and franchise reboot.
 Infini-T Force – A 2017 crossover anime series

References

External links
  (TV series)
  (Live-action movie)
  (TV series)
  (Live-action movie)

 
1973 anime television series debuts
Japanese adult animated superhero television series
Fictional cyborgs
Fuji TV original programming
Sentai Filmworks
Shunsuke Kikuchi
Post-apocalyptic anime and manga
Tatsunoko Production
Superheroes in anime and manga
Post-apocalyptic animated television series